Darran Thomson (born 31 January 1984) is a Scottish footballer.

Thomson played in two games for Hibernian in the Scottish Premier League towards the end of the 2002–03 season as he attempted to earn a new contract from manager Bobby Williamson. Thomson was one of a group of young players, including Scott Brown, Derek Riordan and Steven Whittaker, who were given a chance in the Hibs first team at that time.

Thomson left Hibs in the 2003 close season, however, for the security of a two-year contract offer from First Division club Inverness Caledonian Thistle. Despite playing in the side that gained promotion to the Scottish Premier League and won the Challenge Cup in the 2003–04 season, Thomson was eventually released by Inverness towards the end of that contract. After short stints with several lower division Scottish Football League clubs, Thomson moved into junior football with Bonnyrigg Rose.

In October 2010, Thomson returned to the SFL to sign for Arbroath.

References

External links 

1984 births
Living people
Scottish footballers
Association football midfielders
Hibernian F.C. players
Inverness Caledonian Thistle F.C. players
Elgin City F.C. players
Albion Rovers F.C. players
Alloa Athletic F.C. players
Cowdenbeath F.C. players
Bonnyrigg Rose Athletic F.C. players
Scottish Premier League players
Scottish Football League players
Scottish Junior Football Association players
Arbroath F.C. players
Spartans F.C. players
Vale of Leithen F.C. players